Montgomery & Howard was a 19th-century American shipbuilding company started by Jabez K. Montgomery and A. L. Howard in 1867. The shipyard was on Marginal Street in Chelsea, Massachusetts. Some of the finest boats in the New England cost were designed and built by them. The company stayed in business until 1904. The sidewheel passenger steamer Old Colony was the last vessel that the firm built.

History

During the American Civil War Jabez K. Montgomery and A. L. Howard worked for a large shipbuilding firm in Portland, Maine, where they constructed gunboats for the United States Navy. Both men were born in Warren, Maine, and were school boy friends. In 1867, they came to Chelsea, Massachusetts, to start the Montgomery & Howard shipbuilding company. 

The Montgomery & Howard shipyard was at 37 Marginal Street in Chelsea, Massachusetts, at the foot of Hawthorne Street. They built passenger steamboats, pilot boats, and ferryboats. Some of the finest boats in the New England coast were designed and built by them. They built for the Winnisimmet Ferry Company, Old Colony Steamship Company and the Fall River Line. 

The sidewheel passenger steamer Old Colony was the last vessel that was built by the firm before going out of business in 1904.

Jabez K. Montgomery

Jabez K. Montgomery was born on May 25, 1797, in Warren, Maine where he learned the shipbuilding trade. He is the son of Phillip Montgomery and Olive Faulkner. He worked for a shipbuilding firm in Portland, Main during the Civil War with his friend A. L. Howard. Montgomery moved to Chelsea in 1867 and cofounded the Montgomery & Howard shipbuilding firm. 

Montgomery was one of the best known shipbuilders of New England. He was a director of the First Ward National bank of East Boston and the Globe Gas Light company. He was a member of the common council city government from 1879-1880 and an Alderman in 1881 for six successive years. He lived in Chelsea for over thirty years.

Montgomery died on March 7, 1907, in Chelsea, Massachusetts.

Atwood L. Howard

Atwood L. Howard was born in 1827 in Warren, Maine. He was the son of Thomas Howard and Sarah Keen. He married his first wife, Loda A. Sargent on January 12, 1856, in Haverhill, Massachusetts. He married his second wife, Mary A. Saunders on July 15, 1896, in Boston, Massachusetts.  

Howard learned shipbuilding from his father who was a well-known shipbuilder and mechanic. He moved to Chelsea to develop the Montgomery & Howard firm with his friend Jabez K. Montgomery. He lived in Chelsea for over thirty years. 

Howard was a member of the Review club and was an established equestrian. He was one of the founders of the Hauthorne Club Stables. 

Howard died on December 22, 1902, in Chelsea, Massachusetts. Funeral services were conducted at his home by Rev R. Perry Bush, pastor of the First Universalist Church of Chelsea. Many shipbuilders and residents of Boston attended the services. He was buried at his birthplace in Warren, Maine.

List of ships

List of Montgomery & Howard ships.

See also
 List of Northeastern U. S. Pilot Boats

External sites
 Montgomery & Howard, Chelsea, Massachusetts

References

Companies established in 1867
Defunct shipbuilding companies of the United States
1867 establishments in Massachusetts
American shipbuilders
American businesspeople in shipping